The Vashon Ranger R7 is an American light-sport aircraft designed and produced by Vashon Aircraft of Woodinville, Washington. It was formally introduced at the AirVenture airshow in Oshkosh, Wisconsin in July 2018. The aircraft is supplied complete ready-to-fly-aircraft.

Design and development
The development of the Ranger R7 started in about 2013. By February 2018 two prototypes were flying and four production aircraft were under construction, for April 2018 delivery.

The aircraft is an all-metal monocoque design and features a cantilever high-wing, a two-seats-in-side-by-side configuration enclosed cabin, accessed by doors, fixed tricycle landing gear, with a castering nosewheel and a single engine in tractor configuration. The aircraft is made from pre-painted sheet 6061-T6 aluminum to save construction time. The seats fold flat to allow sleeping in the cabin when camping.

The company manufactures the majority of parts itself to reduce costs and shorten the supply chain.

By January 2018 the design had been accepted by the United States Federal Aviation Administration (FAA) as a light-sport aircraft.

Operational history
By May 2017, one example had been registered in the United States with the FAA.

By April 2019, 12 production aircraft had been delivered to customers, which included individuals and flight schools. By August 2021, 50 aircraft had been delivered and by November 2021, 66 had been delivered.

Variants

Ranger R7 Yellowstone
Base model powered by a  Continental O-200-D four-stroke, air-cooled powerplant and fitted with a Dynon SkyView Touch glass cockpit avionics system. No longer in production.

Ranger R7 Glacier 
Intermediate model powered by a  Continental O-200-D  four-stroke, air-cooled powerplant and fitted with a 10" Dynon SkyView HDX glass cockpit avionics system, additional exterior options are also available. This variant is now the base model aircraft available.

Ranger R7 Redwood 
Premium model powered by a  Continental O-200-D  four-stroke, air-cooled powerplant and fitted with dual 10" Dynon SkyView HDX glass cockpit avionics system, additional exterior options are also available.

Ranger R7 Cascade 
IFR Capable model powered by a  Continental O-200-D  four-stroke, air-cooled powerplant and fitted with dual 10" Dynon SkyView HDX glass cockpit avionics system as well a Garmin GTN 650Xi (GPS/MFD/COM/NAV), additional exterior options are also available.

Specifications (R7)

References

External links

Video review on AVweb

Ranger R7
2010s United States sport aircraft
2010s United States civil utility aircraft
Single-engined tractor aircraft
High-wing aircraft